Norwegian national roads (Norwegian: Riksvei/Riksveg abbr. Rv; literally: road of the rike/realm), are roads thus categorized by the Norwegian Public Roads Administration (Statens vegvesen) which also maintains them.

From 2010, after an administrative reform, most of the national roads were transferred to the counties. They are now called county roads along with the already existing county roads.  of national roads were transferred along with an annual compensation of 6.9 billion NOK for maintenance.

National roads are selected by the criteria of being important for long-distance travel. Some roads connecting to primary airports are also included.

National roads are divided into two categories: European routes and other national roads. The route signs for the European routes have an "E" preceding the national road number, and the sign is green with white script. Other national roads are also designated using green signs.

Former national roads 
All pre-2010 national roads have an asphalt concrete cover. Exceptions are some roads that have been given special status or protection. The "gravel roads package" was a governmental plan which ensured that all national roads without special importance in the National Protection Plan for Roads, Bridges, and Road-Related Cultural Heritage (Nasjonal verneplan for veger, bruer og vegrelaterte kulturminner) received asphalt covering. Norwegian National Road 716 between Bergli and Valen in Frøya, Sør-Trøndelag was the last regular stretch of national road with a gravel coating. The last two remaining kilometers were asphalted on December 17, 2003, with participation by Minister of Transport and Communications Torild Skogsholm, among others.

Norwegian former national roads that are maintained as gravel roads according to the protection plan are Road 252 (Tyin–Eidsbugarden), Road 258 (Grotli-Ospeli bru) and Road 886 (Bjørnstad–Jacobselv). All these roads have been converted to county roads after the reform.

The organization of national, county and village roads (later municipal roads) was introduced in 1931. Starting in 1912, the roads were divided into main roads ("hovedveier") and village roads ("bygdeveier"). In 1931, signposted numbers for national roads were introduced. The main roads were two digits ending with zero, for example Road 50 Oslo–Kirkenes. The main roads in Østfold were numbered 1–9 based on an older local system. In 1965, a new system which included E-roads was introduced, and most of it is still used today (2019).

Records of Norwegian national roads

See also
 Swedish national road
 Motorvei

References

National roads